Bielzia coerulans, commonly known as the Carpathian blue slug or simply the blue slug, is a species of very large land slug, a terrestrial pulmonate gastropod in the family Limacidae, the keelback slugs.

Taxonomy
Bielzia coerulans was discovered in 1847 and described under the name Limax coerulans by Austrian-Hungarian malacologist, Michael Bielz (1787-1866), in 1851. (His son Eduard Albert Bielz was also a malacologist.)

Bielzia coerulans is the only species in the genus Bielzia.

Some authors, for example Russian malacologists, classify genus Bielzia  as the only genus (monotypic) within the separate family, Limacopsidae. There is also a separate subfamily, Bielziinae, for genus Bielzia (I. M. Likharev & Wiktor, 1980).

According to the taxonomy of Bouchet & Rocroi (2005), Limacopsidae and Bielziinae are synonyms for Limacinae.

Distribution

This species is endemic to the Carpathian Mountains in Central and Eastern Europe.

The type locality of Bielzia coerulans is South Carpathians in Romania.

 Czech Republic - in Moravia only, vulnerable (VU) in Moravia
 Southern Poland
 Slovakia
 Ukraine
 Romania
 Hungary
 Germany (presumed introduction in Westerwald, Rhineland-Palatinate, discovered 2012)

Description
This slug turns blue when an adult and becomes 100 – 140 mm in length. It is evenly blue or bluish green (occasionally black) with a dark greyish head and tentacles, and margins pale yellowish, sole pale yellowish or whitish.

Juveniles are yellowish brown with dark lateral bands.

Reproductive system: Genitalia are without penis. There is only an accessory organ for copulation.

Ecology
Bielzia coerulans inhabits deciduous and coniferous forests in mountains, usually at the bottom, or under dead wood logs.

Maturity is in June to July. Copulation occurs at the soil. There are 30-80 eggs laid in one clutch. Adults die after egg deposition. Half grown juveniles hibernate. Fully grown slugs appear in May.

References
This article incorporates public domain text from the reference.

Limacidae
Monotypic gastropod genera